DFDVD is the first DVD by Dog Fashion Disco released in July 2004. It includes two hours of footage following the band and their exploits on the road through various steps of their career, from early lineups to current. Also included are all their music videos, an entire live set shot in Toronto, Ontario, Canada, a collection of bonus live videos and the making of the "Grease" video. It was out of print, very rare and costly to get a hold of for over seven years, but was re-released on the band's label Razor to Wrist Records in 2012. Creation of the "DFDVD" partially inspired the production of the documentary "Working Class Rock Star".

Track listing

Live in Toronto
"Worm in a Dog's Heart"
"Leper Friend"
"Baby Satan"
"Albino Rhino"
"A Corpse is a Corpse"

Music Videos
"Leper Friend"
"Nude in the Wilderness"
"Grease
"The Acid Memoirs"
"Antiquity's Small Rewards"
"Rat on a Sinking Ship" (UVTV)
"Love Song for a Witch" (UVTV)
"Nude in the Wilderness" (UVTV)

Bonus Live Footage
"Baby Satan"
"Vertigo Motel"
"Pink Riots"

Additional Live in Toronto Footage
"Dr. Piranha"
"Day of the Dead"
"Love Song for a Witch"
"Rat on a Sinking Ship"

Bonus Features
Early DFD
On the Road
In Studio
Thanksgiving With DFD
Making of "Grease"
"Albino Rhino"
Slideshow
Photo Gallery
Band Bio
DVD Trailer

Credits
Todd Smith - Vocals
Jasan Stepp - Guitar
Greg Combs - guitar (former)
Jeff Siegel - Keyboards
Brian "Wendy" White - Bass
Steve Mears - bass (former)
Mike "Ollie" Oliver - Drums
John Ensminger - drums (former)
Derek Brewer - Management
Jeff Cohen, Esq. - Legal
Justin McConnell - Art Direction & Design
Mike Kelley - Booking
Unstable Ground - DVD production company
Justin McConnell - DVD author/director
Tom Gregg - cameraman
Greg Sommer - cameraman
Dylan Harrison - cameraman
Felipe Rodrigues - cameraman
Kevin Hutchinson - cameraman
Nathan Roberts - cameraman (9:30 Club footage; uncredited)
Carlos Batts - director (Leper Friend, Nude in the Wilderness)

References

Dog Fashion Disco albums
2004 video albums
2004 live albums
2004 compilation albums
Live video albums
Music video compilation albums